Ljutovo is a village located in the Subotica municipality, in the North Bačka District of Serbia. It is situated in the autonomous province of Vojvodina. The village is ethnically mixed and its population numbering 1,181 people (2002 census).

Name
In Serbian the village is known as Ljutovo or Љутово, in Bunjevac as Ljutovo or Mirgeš, in Croatian as Mirgeš (since 2009) or Ljutovo (before 2009), in Hungarian as Mérges, and in German as Bösendorf.

Ethnic groups (2002 census)

379  Bunjevci
308  Croats
162  Hungarians
91   Serbs

Historical population

1981: 1,411 
1991: 1,182

References
Slobodan Ćurčić, Broj stanovnika Vojvodine, Novi Sad, 1996.

See also
List of places in Serbia
List of cities, towns and villages in Vojvodina

Places in Bačka
Subotica
Bunjevci